Chortoq is a district of Namangan Region in Uzbekistan. The capital lies at the city Chortoq. Its area is 377 km2. Its population is 202,200 (2021 est.).

The district consists of one city (Chortoq), 12 urban-type settlements (Muchum, Koroskon, Koʻshan, Ayqiron, Alixon, Pastki Peshqoʻrgʻon, Yuqori Peshqoʻrgʻon, Ora ariq, Baliqli koʻl, Xazratishox) and 9 rural communities.

References 

Districts of Uzbekistan
Namangan Region